Klaus Wagner (March 31, 1910 – February 6, 2000) was a German mathematician known for his contributions to graph theory.

Education and career
Wagner studied topology at the University of Cologne under the supervision of  who had been a student of Issai Schur. Wagner received his Ph.D. in 1937, with a dissertation concerning the Jordan curve theorem and four color theorem, and taught at Cologne for many years himself. In 1970, he moved to the University of Duisburg, where he remained until his retirement in 1978.

Graph minors

Wagner is known for his contributions to graph theory and particularly the theory of graph minors, graphs that can be formed from a larger graph by contracting and removing edges.

Wagner's theorem characterizes the planar graphs as exactly those graphs that do not have as a minor either a complete graph K5 on five vertices or a complete bipartite graph K3,3 with three vertices on each side of its bipartition. That is, these two graphs are the only minor-minimal non-planar graphs. It is closely related to, but should be distinguished from, Kuratowski's theorem, which states that the planar graphs are exactly those graphs that do not contain as a subgraph a subdivision of K5 or K3,3.

Another result of his, also known as Wagner's theorem, is that a four-connected graph is planar if and only if it has no K5 minor. This implies a characterization of the graphs with no K5 minor as being constructed from planar graphs and Wagner graph (an eight-vertex Möbius ladder) by clique-sums, operations that glue together subgraphs at cliques of up to three vertices and then possibly remove edges from those cliques. This characterization was used by Wagner to show that the case k = 5 of the Hadwiger conjecture on the chromatic number of Kk-minor-free graphs is equivalent to the four color theorem. Analogous characterizations of other families of graphs in terms of the summands of their clique-sum decompositions have since become standard in graph minor theory.

Wagner conjectured in the 1930s (although this conjecture was not published until later) that in any infinite set of graphs, one graph is isomorphic to a minor of another. The truth of this conjecture implies that any family of graphs closed under the operation of taking minors (as planar graphs are) can automatically be characterized by finitely many forbidden minors analogously to Wagner's theorem characterizing the planar graphs. Neil Robertson and Paul Seymour finally published a proof of Wagner's conjecture in 2004 and it is now known as the Robertson–Seymour theorem.

Recognition
Wagner was honored in 1990 by a festschrift on graph theory, and in June 2000, following Wagner's death, the University of Cologne hosted a Festkolloquium in his memory.

Selected publications
.

References

1910 births
2000 deaths
20th-century German mathematicians
Topologists
Graph theorists